Remscheid-Güldenwerth station is a station on the Wuppertal-Oberbarmen–Solingen railway in the Remscheid district of Güldenwerth in the German state of North Rhine Westphalia. It is served by line S 7 of the Rhine-Ruhr S-Bahn, branded as Der Müngstener, operated every 20 minutes from Monday to Friday and generally every half-hour on weekends and at off-peak times, using (LINT 41) vehicles.

Until 15 December 1913 the station was served by Regional-Express service RB 47, operated by DB Regio NRW, normally with two-carriage sets of class 628.4. The Abellio Deutschland company won a contract that was put to tender in November 2010 and took over the operation of passenger services on the route from December 2013 for a period of 15 years.

The station is served by bus route 654 (Reinshagen – Remscheid - Lennep - Lüttringhausen - Klausen) at 20-minute intervals and route 648 (Morsbach (- Müngsten) – Remscheid - Falkenberg) at 60-minute intervals, both operated by Stadtwerke Remscheid.

References

Rhine-Ruhr S-Bahn stations
S7 (Rhine-Ruhr S-Bahn)
Railway stations in Germany opened in 1898